Magaraasi is a 1967 Indian Tamil-language film directed by M. A. Thirumugam, starring Jayalalithaa and Ravichandran. It is noted for being the debut film of the music composer duo Shankar–Ganesh.  The film was released on 14 April 1967.

Plot

Cast 
 Jayalalithaa
 Ravichandran
 Nagesh

Soundtrack 
The music was composed by Shankar–Ganesh making their debut. It was Kavignar Kannadhasan who recommended the name of the duo to the producer Sandow M. M. A. Chinnappa Thevar.

Release and reception 
Magaraasi was released during 14 April 1967, during Puthandu. The film faced competition from Pattanathil Bhootham, released on the same day, and failed at the box-office. Kalki appreciated Nagesh's comedy, saying they give life to the film, but criticised the music and writing.

References

External links 
 

1960s Tamil-language films
1967 films
Films directed by M. A. Thirumugam
Films scored by Shankar–Ganesh